Alfred Sydney Leigh (August 1893 – after 1958), known as Syd Leigh, was a professional association footballer who played in The Football League for Derby County and Bristol Rovers.

His first club was Osmaston, who played near his home town of Shardlow in Derbyshire, and from there he joined Derby County. He played twice for The Rams during the 1919–20 season, before moving to play for Bristol Rovers in their first two seasons in the Football League. He was the first player to score four goals in a League game for the Bristol side, and scored a total of 36 goals from 70 games for them. In spite of this impressive goal return he was unable to find another Football League club to play for when he returned home to Derbyshire in 1922 due to being unable to settle in the West Country.

References

1893 births
Year of death missing
People from Shardlow
Footballers from Derbyshire
English footballers
Association football forwards
English Football League players
Derby County F.C. players
Bristol Rovers F.C. players